The British National Individual Pursuit Championships are held annually as part of the British National Track Championships organised by British Cycling. A women's championship was held for the first time in 1960.

The race is contested over 4,000 metres but the former Professional version was contested over 5,000 metres.

Men's 4,000 metres Senior Race

Am = Amateur / Pro = Professional

Women's 3,000 metres Senior Race

Men's Junior Race

Women's Junior Race

Male Youth Race

Female Youth Race

References

Cycle racing in the United Kingdom
National track cycling championships
National championships in the United Kingdom
Annual sporting events in the United Kingdom